Joseph P. Barricklow (February 7, 1867 – March 23, 1924) was an American lawyer, politician, and osteopath.

Barricklow was born in Rising Sun, Indiana. In 1871, he moved with his parents to a farm in Arcola, Illinois. Barricklow went to the public schools and started to teach school in 1885. He studied law and was admitted to the Illinois bar in 1893. Barricklow joined the Illinois National Guard in 1885 and was commissioned a captain. Barricklow served in the Illinois House of Representatives from 1895 to 1899 and was a Democrat. Barricklow studied osteopathic medicine in St. Charles, Missouri and then moved to Daytona Beach, Florida where he practiced osteopathic medicine. He died in Daytona Beach, Florida after having surgery for appendicitis.

Notes

External links

1867 births
1924 deaths
People from Arcola, Illinois
People from Daytona Beach, Florida
People from Rising Sun, Indiana
Illinois National Guard personnel
American osteopaths
Illinois lawyers
Democratic Party members of the Illinois House of Representatives
19th-century American lawyers